Dil Dosti Dobara is the second season of the Marathi show Dil Dosti Duniyadari. It is a reboot sequel. The same cast has been seen portraying different characters. This show was unable to attract the audience to the standard of its prequel. The show was called off air after completing 152 episodes on 12 August 2017.

The channel changed the characters and the plot completely and introduced new characters and setup in the serial Dil Dosti Dobara keeping the lead actors same, but neither the characters nor the plot could achieve the popularity of the original Dil Dosti Duniyadari and slowly the viewership of the serial reduced. Also, Amey had to leave the show due to his prior commitments and the serial further slide in the hole. The series premiered on 18 February 2016 by replacing 100 Days.

Cast

Main
 Pooja Thombre as Anandi. A very sweet orphan and left the orphanage when she turned 18. She gave shelter to Mukta and Pari and is beautician by profession. She can't cook good food.
 Suvrat Joshi as Gaurav Bal. He left his house when learned about his father's corrupt policies. He was the agent of Magnet Water Company which eventually turned out to fraud and Gaurav lives with the guilt.
 Swanandi Tikekar as Mukta. She is from Beed and used to love studies but left her home and studies to shift to Mumbai to earn money for her family of Mother and three younger sisters.
 Pushkaraj Chirputkar as Phanindranath "Papya" Rane. He dislikes his name and hence gets called as Papya and is a known social activist. He leaves his house of Lalbaug due to accommodation issues. His best childhood friend Chandrakant (Bhapav) is attached to him.
 Sakhi Gokhale as Pari Patwardhan. She is an interior designer by profession who was brought up in the safe environment by her family. She fled on her wedding day due to upcoming responsibilities and want to enjoy life.
 Amey Wagh as Sahil. He is chocolate hero of the gang. He has dated many girls and is Hotel Manager by profession. He has gave up 8 jobs until he starts Khayali Pulao.

Recurring
 Vikrant Shinde as Chandrakant (Bhapav). He is Papya's childhood buddy and considers his right hand. His catchphrase is "Tumcha hukum apla ekka na bhai!".
 Uday Tikekar as Captain Cook. He is a strict army Chef who joins Khayali Pulao on Sahil's recommendations. He earlier used to get annoyed by the gang, but later gets used to them. He leaves Khayali Pulao when Mukta defeats him in the Pitla Bhakri Challenge.
 Anand Kale as Shirish Pradhan, Sahil's father.
 Meera Joshi as Jonita, Thapa's daughter. She is an NRI. Due to her beauty, Sahil, Gaurav and Papya have a crush on her.
 Dhawal Pokle as Cyrus Sandhya, Bawa and Sandhya's son; Savi's twin brother.
 Aarti More as Savitri Govitrikar, Bawa and Sandhya's daughter; Cyrus's twin sister.
 Ajinkya Joshi as Firoj Balsara, Bawa and his first wife's son.
 Vijay Patwardhan as Pari's father.
 Shraddha Pokhrankar as Urmila

References

External links 
 
 Dil Dosti Dobara at ZEE5

Marathi-language television shows
Zee Marathi original programming
Indian television spin-offs
2017 Indian television series debuts
2017 Indian television series endings